Huaibei Coal Mining Group is a state-owned coal mining company based in Huaibei, Anhui, China. It was founded in 1958.

References

External links
 

Coal companies of China
Government-owned companies of China